Simi Valley station is a passenger rail station in the city of Simi Valley, California. Amtrak's Pacific Surfliner from San Luis Obispo to San Diego and Metrolink's Ventura County Line from Los Angeles Union Station to East Ventura stop here.

 Amtrak's Coast Starlight serves the station with one train daily in each direction. 

Of the 74 California stations served by Amtrak, Simi Valley was the 37th-busiest in FY2012, boarding or detraining an average of approximately 111 passengers daily.

History
The Southern Pacific Railroad built a line between Ventura and Los Angeles, as an alternate to the Montalvo to Newhall line. The first passenger station to serve the Rancho Simi area was the Santa Susana Depot, originally located at Tapo Street and Los Angeles Avenue. The depot served the community of Santa Susana which is now mostly within the city of Simi Valley. The historic Santa Susana Depot building has since been preserved and moved three miles east of its original location.

The station parking location was acquired for CalTrain by 1982. Located one mile east of the Tapo Street depot location, the station opened with the inauguration of CalTrain in 1982. The first trips were on October 18, 1982. The CalTrain service was discontinued by 1983.

The Amtrak Coast Starlight began stopping there on October 26, 1986. On June 26, 1988, Amtrak extended one daily San Diegan round trip to Santa Barbara, stopping at the Simi Valley station. Metrolink Ventura County Line service began on October 26, 1992, stopping at all former CalTrain stations (except Oxnard, which Metrolink began serving after the 1994 Northridge earthquake). 

A project to improve the station was announced in 2020. The plan includes a second passenger platform and pedestrian crossing along with a second track which would allow eastbound and westbound trains to be at the station at the same time. As part of the Southern California Optimized Rail Expansion Program, the project will improve safety, enable more frequent service and make existing service more reliable.

References

External links 

 Simi Valley Amtrak-Metrolink Station (USA RailGuide -- TrainWeb)

Amtrak stations in Ventura County, California
Buildings and structures in Simi Valley, California
Bus stations in Ventura County, California
Metrolink stations in Ventura County, California
Railway stations in the United States opened in 1982
Railway stations closed in 1983
Railway stations in the United States opened in 1986
Amtrak